Stensgård Church is "long church" dating from 1902 in the municipality of Nannestad in Viken county, Norway. The church is part of the Church of Norway and it belongs to the deanery of Øvre Romerike in the Diocese of Borg.

The building can accommodate 92 people. The cornerstone was laid in a simple ceremony on Saint John's Day in 1901. It was consecrated on November 26, 1902 in a mass celebrated by Bishop Anton Christian Bang attended by eight priests.

References

External links
 Stensgård Church at Kirkesøk
 Stensgård Church at the Directorate for Cultural Heritage website

Churches in Viken
Churches completed in 1902
1902 establishments in Norway
20th-century Church of Norway church buildings